Pullela Gopichand (born 16 November 1973) is a former Indian badminton player. Currently, he is the Chief National Coach for the India national badminton team. He won the All England Open Badminton Championships in 2001, becoming the second Indian to achieve this feat after Prakash Padukone. He runs the Gopichand Badminton Academy. He received the Arjuna Award in 1999, the Dronacharya Award in 2009 and the Padma Bhushan – India's third highest civilian award – in 2014.

Early life
Pullela Gopichand was born on 16 November 1973 near Chirala Town to Mr. Pullela Subash Chandra and Mrs. Pullela Subbaravamma, in Prakasam district, Andhra Pradesh. Initially, he was interested in playing cricket, but his elder brother encouraged him to take up badminton instead. His family settled in Nizamabad for a while. He did his schooling in St. Paul's High School, Hyderabad. He joined A. V. College, Hyderabad and graduated in public administration. He was the captain of the Indian combined universities badminton team in 1990 and 1991.

Playing career
Pullela was coached by S. M. Arif before Prakash Padukone accepted him at  Prakash Padukone academy . He also trained under Ganguly Prasad at the SAI Bangalore. Pullela won his first National Badminton Championship title in 1996, and went on to win the title five times in a row, until 2000. He won two gold medals and one silver medal at the Indian national games, 1998, held at Imphal. At the international level, he represented India in 3 Thomas Cup tournaments. In 1996, he won a gold in the SAARC badminton tournament at Vijayawada and defended his crown in the next games held at Colombo in 1997. At the 1998 Commonwealth Games, he won a silver in the team event and a bronze in men's singles.

In 1999, he won the Toulouse Open Championship in France and the Scottish Open Championship in Scotland. He also emerged as the winner at the Asian satellite tournament held at Hyderabad in the same year, and lost in the final match of the German Grand Prix Championship.

In 2001, he won the All England Open Badminton Championships at Birmingham. He defeated then world number one Peter Gade in the semi-finals before defeating Chen Hong of China to lift the trophy. He became the second Indian to achieve the feat after Prakash Padukone, who won in 1980.

Achievements

Asian Championships 
Men's singles

Commonwealth Games 
Men's singles

IBF World Grand Prix 
The World Badminton Grand Prix sanctioned by International Badminton Federation (IBF) from 1983 to 2006.

Men's singles

IBF International 

Men's singles

Coaching career

After retiring from his playing career, Pullela founded the Gopichand Badminton Academy in 2008 after reportedly mortgaging his own house. Nimmagadda Prasad, a renowned industrialist, donated  on a condition that his academy win a medal for India at the Olympics in badminton. The academy produced several badminton players including Saina Nehwal, P. V. Sindhu, Sai Praneeth, Parupalli Kashyap, Srikanth Kidambi, Arundhati Pantawane, Gurusai Datt, and Arun Vishnu. Saina Nehwal went on to win the bronze medal at the 2012 Summer Olympics, while P. V. Sindhu went on to win the silver medal at the 2016 Summer Olympics, the bronze medal at the pandemic-hit 2020 Summer Olympics, and also became the first Indian to win the gold medal at the BWF World Championships. Pullela also served as the official Indian Olympic Badminton Team coach at the 2016 Rio Olympics held in Brazil.

Awards and honours

 Arjuna Award, 1999.
 Major Dhyan Chand Khel Ratna, 2001 
 Padma Shri, 2005
 Dronacharya Award, 2009 
 Padma Bhushan, 2014
 Rashtriya Khel Protsahan Puruskar, 2013, under Category Establishment and Management of Sports Academies of Excellence- Pullela Gopichand Academy of Badminton, Hyderabad
 He was bestowed upon an honorary doctorate by IIT Kanpur on the occasion of their 52nd Convocation.
Rewards for Coaching the 2016 Rio Summer Olympics silver medallist P. V. Sindhu
  from the Government of Telangana
  from Badminton Association of India
  from the Government of Andhra Pradesh

Personal life
Pullela married fellow badminton player P. V. V. Lakshmi on 5 June 2002. They have two children, a daughter named Gayathri and a son named Vishnu.

In Dec 2020, he launched guided meditation sessions for athletes named "Dhyana for Sports" in the App Dhyana. The sessions have been designed by him based on his experience training athletes. He is also the Director of Dhyana. Dhyana, in collaboration with Heartfulness Institute, was the official meditation partner of the Indian Olympic Association’s (IOA) for Tokyo 2020 Olympic games.

References

External links
 

1973 births
Living people
Indian male badminton players
Indian sports coaches
Telugu people
Indian national badminton champions
Racket sportspeople from Andhra Pradesh
Badminton coaches
Badminton players at the 2002 Asian Games
Badminton players at the 1998 Asian Games
People from Prakasam district
Commonwealth Games silver medallists for India
Commonwealth Games bronze medallists for India
Recipients of the Arjuna Award
Recipients of the Khel Ratna Award
Recipients of the Dronacharya Award
Recipients of the Padma Shri in sports
Recipients of the Padma Bhushan in sports
Commonwealth Games medallists in badminton
Badminton players at the 2002 Commonwealth Games
Badminton players at the 1998 Commonwealth Games
Olympic badminton players of India
Badminton players at the 2000 Summer Olympics
Asian Games competitors for India
Indian badminton coaches
Medallists at the 1998 Commonwealth Games